Ronald Arana Céspedes (born January 18, 1977 in Santa Cruz de la Sierra) is a Bolivian retired football defender.

Club career
Arana began his professional career with Club Destroyers in 1996. The following year he transferred to Oriente Petrolero where he spent most of his career. Arana also have had brief spells playing for The Strongest, La Paz F.C., Bolívar, Municipal Real Mamoré and Guabirá, as well as, Argentine club Rosario Central.

International career
He made his debut for the Bolivia national team in 1999, and has been capped 20 times since. He represented his country in 7 FIFA World Cup qualification matches and played at the 1999 FIFA Confederations Cup.

Honours
Liga de Fútbol Profesional Boliviano: 2
 2001, 2004 (C) (Oriente Petrolero)

References

External links
 
 
 

1977 births
Living people
Sportspeople from Santa Cruz de la Sierra
Association football defenders
Bolivian footballers
Bolivia international footballers
1999 FIFA Confederations Cup players
2004 Copa América players
Club Destroyers players
Oriente Petrolero players
The Strongest players
Rosario Central footballers
La Paz F.C. players
Club Bolívar players
Municipal Real Mamoré players
Guabirá players
Bolivian expatriate footballers
Expatriate footballers in Argentina
Oriente Petrolero managers
Club Deportivo Guabirá managers